That Malicious Age (Italian: Quella età maliziosa) is a 1975 Italian erotic drama film co-written and directed by Silvio Amadio. It features Nino Castelnuovo and Gloria Guida.

Plot 

Napoleone (Castelnuovo) is an artist bored of his married life and applies to work as a gardener at a summer mansion. On his way to Elba, he meets an attractive teenage girl (Guida) who attempts to seduce him and when he gets to the mansion, he learns that she is Paola, his employers' daughter living with her mother (Anita Sanders) and stepfather (Silvio Amadio). The mother is soon attracted to Napoleone but he has a growing affection for Paola, fuelled by her flirtatious behavior and his passion eventually turns into violence against a mentally disturbed fisherman (Mimmo Palmara) courting Paola.

Cast
Gloria Guida as Paola
Nino Castelnuovo as Napoleone
Anita Sanders as Paola's mother
Mimmo Palmara as Fisher
Andrea Aureli as Adolfo, the writer
Fabio Garriba

Critical reception
The film was generally badly received by critics. Italian critic Paolo Mereghetti described the film as "unresolved", noting the ambitious efforts to combine melodramatic tension, psychological introspection and class morality but concluding that these aspirations ended up getting lost in long sequences of silences and panoramic views. The review of the website LogTake pointed out the unconvincing "awkward juxtaposition (rather than contamination) of genres" of the film, which starts as a commedia erotica abruptly turning to drama, and refers to the film as "uncertain, confused, approximate, annoyingly misogynistic".

References

External links

That Malicious Age at OFDb.de

1975 romantic drama films
1975 films
Films directed by Silvio Amadio
Films set in the Mediterranean Sea
Films set in Tuscany
Films set on islands
Italian coming-of-age drama films
Italian romantic drama films
1970s Italian-language films
1970s coming-of-age drama films
Films scored by Roberto Pregadio
1970s Italian films